Irving H. C. Tai is a Taiwanese politician. He was the Deputy Minister of the Research, Development and Evaluation Commission of the Executive Yuan until 21 January 2014.

Education
Tai received his bachelor's degree in law from Soochow University School of Law, master's in law from Tamkang University and doctorate in European studies from Tamkang University.

References

Political office-holders in the Republic of China on Taiwan
Living people
Academic staff of Soochow University (Taiwan)
Tamkang University alumni
Year of birth missing (living people)